The Huff-Daland Type XV Training Water-Cooled TW-5 was a biplane trainer designed by the Huff-Daland Aero Corporation in the early 1920s for the United States Army Air Service.

Design and development
It was a development of the TA-6 (which itself was a one-off redesigned TA-2 with a 220 hp Lawrance J-1 air-cooled engine) but powered by a 190 hp Wright-Hispano E2. In 1924, the letter-and-number system was revised, and the TW-5 became an Advanced Trainer AT-1. In 1927, Huff-Daland Aero Corporation became a division of Keystone Aircraft Corporation.

Operational history
Versions of the AT-1 were built for the United States Navy as training and observation aircraft.

Variants
The

TA-6 (Trainer, Air-cooled type 6)
Powered by the 200 hp Lawrance J-1 air-cooled engine, 1 built
TW-5 (Trainer, Water-cooled type 5)
Powered by the 150-hp (112-kW) Wright-Hispano I engine, 5 built.
AT-1
U.S. Army Advanced Trainer, 10 built.
AT-2
One aircraft tested in a number of single-seat and two-seat versions
HN-1
United States Navy version of the AT-1 powered by a 180hp Wright-Hispano E2 engine, 3 built.
HN-2
United States Navy version of the AT-1 powered by a 200hp Lawrance J-1, 3 built.
HO-1
United States Navy observation version of the HN-1 powered by a 180hp Wright-Hispano E2 engine with interchangeable wheel or float undercarriage, 3 built

Operators

United States Army Air Service
United States Navy

Specifications (AT-1)

See also

References

"United States Military Aircraft Since 1908" by Gordon Swanborough & Peter M. Bowers, 1977, 675 pp.

Huff-Daland TW-05
TW-05
Single-engined tractor aircraft
Biplanes